is a railway station on the Takayama Main Line in the city of Kakamigahara, Gifu Prefecture, Japan, operated by Central Japan Railway Company (JR Central).

Lines

Station layout
Unuma Station has one ground-level side platform and one ground-level island platform connected by a footbridge. The station has a Midori no Madoguchi staffed ticket office.

Platforms

Adjacent stations

History
Unuma Station opened on November 12, 1921. The station was absorbed into the JR Central network upon the privatization of Japanese National Railways (JNR) on April 1, 1987.

Passenger statistics
In fiscal 2015, the station was used by an average of 1,377 passengers daily (boarding passengers only).

Surrounding area
Meitetsu Shin-Unuma Station (connected by a passageway)

See also
 List of Railway Stations in Japan

References

Railway stations in Gifu Prefecture
Takayama Main Line
Railway stations in Japan opened in 1921
Stations of Central Japan Railway Company
Kakamigahara, Gifu